SS Uruguay may refer to:

 , launched in 1912 and renamed Uruguay in 1931
 , launched in 1928 and renamed Uruguay in 1938

Ship names